Griffin Township is one of nineteen current townships in Pope County, Arkansas, USA. As of the 2010 census, its total population was 839.

Geography

Cities, towns, and villages
Appleton

References
 United States Census Bureau 2008 TIGER/Line Shapefiles
 United States Board on Geographic Names (GNIS)
 United States National Atlas

External links
 US-Counties.com
 City-Data.com

Townships in Pope County, Arkansas
Populated places established in 1854
Townships in Arkansas
1854 establishments in Arkansas